William Louis Hudson Jr. (born October 17, 1949) is an American musician and actor. He was a vocalist in The Hudson Brothers, a band he formed in 1965 with his two younger brothers, Brett and Mark. He later had a brief acting career, appearing in supporting roles in Zero to Sixty (1978), Hysterical (1983), and Big Shots (1987). He also appeared in a recurring guest role on the series Doogie Howser, M.D..

Early life
Hudson was born and raised in Portland, Oregon, the eldest of three sons (Brett and Mark are his two younger brothers) born to Eleanor (née Salerno) and  William Louis Hudson. His mother was Italian American (his maternal grandfather came from Carlentini, Province of Syracuse, Sicily, Italy). He and his brothers were nephews (by marriage) of actor Keenan Wynn.

Hudson's father left his family when Hudson was six (famously saying he was going out for a pack of cigarettes), and he stated that his mother had to depend on welfare to support her children. He and his siblings were raised in their mother's Catholic faith.

Career

The Hudson Brothers

Other ventures
As an actor, Hudson appeared in the film Big Shots (1987), and three episodes of the television series Doogie Howser, M.D. from 1989 to 1992.

Hudson released his memoir, Two Versions: The Other Side of Fame and Family, in December 2011.

Personal life
In 1974, Hudson dated actress Jill St. John. A year later he became involved with Goldie Hawn, and they married in 1976. Hudson filed for divorce in 1980 and it was finalized two years later. They have two children, Oliver Hudson (b. 1976) and Kate Hudson (b. 1979), who were raised by Hawn and Kurt Russell. When Oliver slammed his biological father in a public statement on Father's Day in 2015, Hudson spoke out for the first time to accuse Hawn of "willfully alienating" him from their children through the years. Hudson next had a brief relationship with Ali MacGraw, which dissolved by mid-1981.

Hudson married Cindy Williams in 1982 and they had two children, Emily (b. 1982) and Zachary (b. 1986) before divorcing in 2000.

He and then-girlfriend Caroline Grahamhave a daughter together, Lalania (b. 2006).

In 2018, Hudson's son, Oliver, told Larry King that he and his father had begun speaking again after being estranged for many years.

Hudson campaigned for Democratic politician Michael Dukakis' presidential bid in 1988.

Filmography

References

External links

1949 births
Male actors from Portland, Oregon
American male composers
21st-century American composers
American male film actors
American male singer-songwriters
American people of English descent
American people of Italian descent
American male television actors
American multi-instrumentalists
Catholics from Oregon
Cleveland High School (Portland, Oregon) alumni
Living people
Musicians from Portland, Oregon
Hudson family (show business)
Singer-songwriters from Oregon
21st-century American male musicians